World Series of Fighting Global Championship 2: Japan was a mixed martial arts event held on February 7, 2016 at the Tokyo Dome City Hall in Tokyo, Japan.

Background
The event was headlined by a fight between Evgeny Erokhin and Brandon Cash for the inaugural WSOF GC Heavyweight Championship. Erokhin fought for the belt against Jeremy May in November at WSOF GC: China 1, but the fight ended in a no contest because of an eye poke.

Results

See also
List of WSOF champions
List of WSOF events

References

World Series of Fighting events
2016 in mixed martial arts
2016 in Japanese sport
Sports competitions in Tokyo
Mixed martial arts in Japan